V. V. Dakshinamoorthi (20 May 1935 – 31 August 2016) was a senior Communist Party of India (Marxist) (CPI(M)) leader and member of the Kerala state secretariat.

See also
Politics of India

References

Communist Party of India (Marxist) politicians from Kerala
1935 births
2016 deaths
Kerala MLAs 1967–1970
Kerala MLAs 1980–1982